Erik Sandin (born July 29, 1966), is an American musician and the drummer of the punk rock band NOFX, and former member of punk rock band Caustic Cause.  He was a founding member of NOFX when they formed in Hollywood, California, in 1983.

Two years after forming NOFX, he moved to Santa Barbara, leaving the band. In just one year without Sandin, the band had already gone through two drummers (Scott Sellers and Scott Aldahl) and in 1986 the band talked Sandin into rejoining NOFX.

He has been NOFX's permanent drummer since his return in 1986, and played drums on every NOFX full-length album and EP released, including the 2007 live album They've Actually Gotten Worse Live!. The band Dogpiss featured a song about him called "Erik Sandin's Stand In" on the Fat Wreck Chords compilation album Short Music for Short People.

Before the recording of the 1992 album White Trash, Two Heebs and a Bean, NOFX frontman Fat Mike gave Sandin an ultimatum. He had to quit heroin or be replaced. After realizing that NOFX was the most important thing in his life and with assistance of Brett Gurewitz and Lynn Strait, Sandin entered rehab at The Ranch in Desert Hot Springs, California for treatment of heroin addiction. Sandin has not used the drug since. As it can be seen in the video series Backstage Passport, he conducts a more sober and "clean" life than his bandmates, often going back to the hotel after a show instead of hanging out and partying with the rest of the band.

Aliases 
Erik Ghint (Arrogant) - White Trash, Two Heebs And A Bean
Erik Shun (Erection) - S&M Airlines
Groggy Nodbeggar - Ribbed
Chris Telmeth (Crystal meth)
Herb Reath Stinks  (Her breath stinks) - Punk in Drublic
Seymour Butts (See more butts) - The Longest Line EP
Smelly - So Long and Thanks for All the Shoes, The War on Errorism, Coaster

Albums with NOFX
1988 Liberal Animation
1989 S&M Airlines
1991 Ribbed
1992 The Longest Line
1992 Maximum Rocknroll
1992 White Trash, Two Heebs and a Bean
1994 Punk in Drublic
1995 I Heard They Suck Live!!
1996 Heavy Petting Zoo
1997 So Long and Thanks for All the Shoes
1999 The Decline
2000 Pump Up the Valuum
2002 45 or 46 Songs That Weren't Good Enough To Go On Our Other Records
2003 The War on Errorism
2006 Wolves in Wolves' Clothing
2007 They've Actually Gotten Worse Live!
2009 Coaster
2009 Cokie the Clown
2011 NOFX
2012 Self Entitled
2016 First Ditch Effort
2021 Single Album

References

NOFX members
1966 births
Living people
American punk rock drummers
American male drummers
American rock drummers
20th-century American drummers